Grand Pass is a mountain pass in the Olympic Mountains in the state of Washington. It is in the Olympic National Park.

References

Landforms of Jefferson County, Washington
Mountain passes of Washington (state)
Olympic Mountains
Landforms of Olympic National Park